Daniel K. Sokol (born 6 August 1978) is a barrister and medical ethicist known for his academic and journalistic writings on the ethics of medicine.

He lectures nationally and internationally, and writes a regular column in the British Medical Journal under the sobriquet Ethics Man. Up until January 2014 Sokol was an honorary Senior Lecturer in Medical Ethics and Law at King's College London. His contract was terminated due to Sokol setting up a for-profit legal enterprise that represented students in exam appeals. He is a member of 12 King's Bench Walk, a leading barristers' chambers in London, England. In late 2019 Sokol founded the Centre for Remedial Ethics.

Education and early life
Sokol was born in Puyricard, France, and educated in France until the age of 11. He attended Winchester College before studying Linguistics and French Literature at St Edmund Hall, Oxford.  As an undergraduate at Oxford he won the 3rd Oxfordshire Science Writing competition in 1999.  He received his Bachelor of Arts (1st class) in 2001 and obtained a Wellcome Trust Award to study a master's degree in Social and Economic History (specialising in the History of Medicine) at Green College, Oxford.  He then studied for a Master's in Medical Ethics at Imperial College London and, under the supervision of Raanan Gillon and Tim Rhodes, completed a PhD in the subject also funded by the Wellcome Trust.

Following his PhD, he was appointed a lecturer in Ethics at Keele University.  In 2008, he moved to St George's, University of London, before qualifying as a barrister at the Inner Temple in 2011.

Career
Sokol has called for the introduction of professional clinical ethicists in British hospitals, argued that doctors have a strong but not absolute duty of care in times of virulent epidemics, and defended the moral permissibility of clinicians deceiving patients in rare circumstances.

In 2005, Sokol co-authored, with Gillian Bergson, an award-winning textbook on medical ethics and law for students. Since 2007, he has written a regular column (as Ethics Man) for the British Medical Journal.

In 2012, Sokol published Doing Clinical Ethics (Springer), a textbook for clinicians.

In late 2012, Sokol founded Alpha Academic Appeals, whose aim is to help university students appeal unjust examination results.  This led to King's College London terminating his appointment as an honorary member of the teaching staff in 2014 after he had held the position for less than a year.  This was on the basis that Alpha was charging students for services that they could obtain for free from the students' union, and therefore it would be undesirable for the College to continue its association with Sokol.

In 2013, he co-authored, with Isabel McArdle, Pupillage Inside Out (Sweet & Maxwell), a guide on the pupillage year (i.e., the first year of a barrister's practice).

He has been a visiting scholar in bioethics at Washington Hospital Center, Washington, D.C., and Providence St. Vincent Medical Center, Oregon, and has sat on a number of committees, including those of the Ministry of Defence, the Ministry of Justice, and the Royal College of Surgeons of England.  He is the senior editor of the Postgraduate Medical Journal.

In October 2018 Book Guild Publishing released his book 'Tough Choices: Stories from the Front Line of Medical Ethics', a text aimed at a general readership.

Sokol set up the Centre for Remedial Ethics in November 2019, which provides bespoke one-to-one medical ethics courses to clinicians undergoing disciplinary procedures.

Personal life
In his personal life, Sokol is a semi-professional magician. He is married, and has three brothers (André, Georges and Charlie) who also live in London.  He is the son of Ronald P. Sokol and Junko Sokol.

References

Living people
1978 births
21st-century British philosophers
Bioethicists
British barristers
British columnists